Following are major historians' estimates of the sizes of the opposing armies in the battle of Borodino, with the years in which those estimates were made.

References

Battles of the Napoleonic Wars